Senator Pound may refer to:

Cuthbert W. Pound (1864–1935), New York State Senate
Stephen Bosworth Pound (1833–1911), Nebraska State Senate
Thaddeus C. Pound (1832–1914), Wisconsin State Senate

See also
Senator Pond (disambiguation)